WABG may refer to:

 WABG (AM), a radio station (960 AM) licensed to Greenwood, Mississippi, United States
 WABG-TV, a television station (channel 6 virtual/32 digital) licensed to Greenwood, Mississippi, United States
WABG-DT2, a television station (channel 6.2 virtual/32.2 digital) licensed to Greenwood, Mississippi, United States
 The ICAO code for Waghete Airport